Banbira, or Banvira, is a village in Bihar, India. It is located in Morwa Tehsil of Samastipur District. It is situated 18km away from sub-district headquarter Morwa and 28km away from district headquarter Samastipur. As per 2009 stats, Banbeera is the gram panchayat of Banbira village.

The total geographical area of village is 219 hectares. In the 2011 census Banbira had a total population of 6,224 people (3,301 male and 2,923 female) spread between 1,323 households. There are about 1,323 houses in Banbira village. Samastipur is nearest town to Banbira which is approximately 28km away.

Nearby villages of Banbira 

Jitwarpur Bhuskhara
Indar Wara
Pachbhinda
Mahmudpur
Kumaia
Halai
Bangora
Purkhotimpur Asli
Purkhotimpur Dakhli
Chaklal Sahi

References 

Villages in Samastipur district